Cigaritis abnormis, the abnormal silverline, is  a species of lycaenid or blue butterfly found in south India and Pakistan.

Description

References

Cigaritis
Butterflies described in 1884
Butterflies of Asia
Taxa named by Frederic Moore